Garris may refer to:

 Garris, Pyrénées-Atlantiques, a commune in France
 Garris (surname)
 The Battle of Garris, fought in 1814 as part of the Peninsular War
 Garris, a character in The Children of the Marshland

See also 
 Garrix